The 2018 Suncorp Super Netball season was the second season of the premier netball league in Australia. The season began on 28 April and concluded with the Grand Final on 26 August 2018. The start of the season was delayed to late April due to the 2018 Commonwealth Games, which was held earlier that month on the Gold Coast. The fixtures for the season were released on 11 October 2017.

Sunshine Coast Lightning were the defending premiers and successfully defended their title, defeating West Coast Fever in the Grand Final at Perth Arena.

Overview

Teams

Format
The season is played over fourteen rounds, allowing every team to play each other twice, once at home and once away. The top four teams on the ladder at the conclusion of the regular season qualify for the finals series. In the first week of the finals series, the 1st ranked team hosts the 2nd ranked team in the major semi-final (with the winner of that match to qualify for the Grand Final) and the 3rd ranked team hosts the 4th ranked team in the minor semi-final (with the loser of that match eliminated). The loser of the major semi-final then hosts the winner of the minor semi-final in the preliminary final. The winner of the major semi-final then hosts the winner of the preliminary final in the Grand Final.

Rule changes
Netball Australia announced a change to the points system for the regular season, with bonus points being introduced. Under the new system, teams earn 4 points for a win and 1 point for every quarter won in a match. A drawn match earns a team 2 points and drawing a quarter earns no points. The winning team can earn a maximum of 8 points per match.

Additionally, teams can request up to two time-outs per half and at any point in time while play is in progress, any one member of the team bench (players and team officials) listed on the official score sheet shall be permitted to move up and down their team bench within the bench zone to communicate with their on-court or off-court players. Finally, umpires can now award a penalty pass for delaying play or intimidation and quarter time and half time breaks will be increased by one and three minutes respectively.

Broadcast
The Nine Network televised two matches each round during the regular season and also televised all finals matches. Telstra televised the other two matches each round. Every match of the season was available to be streamed live via the Netball Australia App. Unlike 2017, Nine telecast their two matches on the main channel, rather than secondary channel 9Gem. The two matches broadcast on Nine were on Saturday and Sunday afternoon.

Regular season

Round 1

Round 2

Round 3

Round 4

Round 5

Round 6

Round 7

Round 8

Round 9

Round 10

Round 11

Round 12

Round 13

Round 14

Ladder

Finals series

Major semi-final

Minor semi-final

Preliminary final

Grand Final

 Grand Final MVP Winner: Caitlin Bassett
 Note: The crowd of 13,722 was an Australian national league record attendance.

Awards

References

External links
 
 Season results

2018
2018 in Australian netball